Crystal City-Pilot Mound/Louise Municipal Airport  is a registered aerodrome located  east of Crystal City, Manitoba, Canada.

References

External links
 Page about this aerodrome on COPA's Places to Fly airport directory

Registered aerodromes in Manitoba